Riel Nason is a Canadian novelist. Her debut novel The Town That Drowned, published in 2011 by Goose Lane Editions, won the Commonwealth Book Prize for Canada and Europe in 2012.  It was also awarded the 2012 Margaret and John Savage First Book Award, was shortlisted for several other literary awards, and was longlisted for the 2013 International IMPAC Dublin Literary Award.

She lives in Quispamsis, New Brunswick. Nason is also a textile artist (quilter) and has had several exhibits of her original work as well as writing two books on the topic.

Works
The Town That Drowned (2011)
All The Things We Leave Behind (2016)
Modern Selvage Quilting (2016)
Sew a Modern Halloween (2017)
The Little Ghost Who Was a Quilt (2020)

References

External links
Riel Nason

21st-century Canadian novelists
Canadian women novelists
Living people
Writers from New Brunswick
People from Kings County, New Brunswick
Canadian writers of young adult literature
Canadian columnists
Women writers of young adult literature
21st-century Canadian women writers
Canadian women non-fiction writers
Canadian women columnists
1969 births
Quilters
Canadian textile artists